Nymphicula trimacula is a moth in the family Crambidae. It was described by George Hampson in 1891. It is found in India's Nilgiris District.

References

Nymphicula
Moths described in 1891